General Ahmad Yani (19 June 1922 – 1 October 1965) was the Commander of the Indonesian Army, and was killed by members of the 30 September Movement during an attempt to kidnap him from his house.

Early life
Ahmad Yani was born in Jenar, Purworejo, Dutch East Indies on 19 June 1922 to the Wongsoredjo family, a family that worked at a sugar factory run by a Dutch owner. In 1927, Yani moved with his family to Batavia, where his father now worked for a Dutch General. At Batavia, Yani worked his way through primary and secondary education. In 1940, Yani left high school to undergo compulsory military service in the colonial government's Army of the Dutch East Indies, where he initially trained as a navy seaman. He studied military topography in Malang, East Java, but this education was interrupted by the Japanese invasion in 1942, at which time Yani and his family moved back to Central Java.

In 1943, he joined the Japanese-sponsored PETA army, and underwent further training in Magelang as an artillery officer and then as a platoon commander; he moved to Bogor, West Java for the latter training, after which he returned to Magelang as an instructor.

Indonesian military career

After Independence Yani joined the army of the fledgling republic and fought against the Dutch. During the first months after the Declaration of Independence, Yani formed a battalion with himself as Commander and led it to victory against the British at Magelang. Yani then followed this up by successfully defending Magelang against the Dutch when it tried to take over the city, earning him the nickname of the "Savior of Magelang". Another notable highlight of Yani's career during this time period was the series of guerrilla offensives he launched in early 1949 to distract the Dutch whilst Lieutenant Colonel Suharto prepared for the 1 March General Offensive which was to be directed at Yogyakarta and its suburbs.

After Indonesia's independence was recognized by the Dutch, Yani was transferred to Tegal, Central Java. In 1952, he was called back into action to fight the Darul Islam, a group of rebels seeking to establish a theocracy. To deal with this rebel group, Yani formed a special forces group called the Banteng Raiders (today the 400th Raider Infantry Battalion, Kodam IV/Diponegoro). Over the next 3 years, Darul Islam forces in Central Java suffered one defeat after another.

In December 1955, Yani left for the United States to study at the Command and General Staff College at Fort Leavenworth. Returning in 1956, Yani was transferred to the Army Headquarters in Jakarta where he became a staff member for General Abdul Haris Nasution. At the Army Headquarters, Yani served as Logistics Assistant to the Army Chief of Staff before becoming Deputy Army Chief of Staff for Organization and Personnel.

In August 1958, he commanded Operation 17 August against the Revolutionary Government of the Republic of Indonesia rebels in West Sumatra. His troops managed to recapture Padang and Bukittinggi, and this success led to his being promoted to 2nd deputy Army chief of staff on 1 September 1962, and then Army chief of staff on 28 June 1962.
(automatically becoming a member of the cabinet), replacing General Nasution, who was appointed Minister of Defence.

Assassination

As President Sukarno moved closer to the Indonesian Communist Party (PKI) in the early 1960s, Yani, who was strongly anti-communist, became very wary of the PKI, especially after the party declared its support for the establishment of a people's militia and Sukarno tried to impose his Nasakom (Nationalism-Religion-Communism) doctrine on the military. Both Yani and Nasution procrastinated when ordered by Sukarno on 31 May 1965 to prepare plans to arm the people.

In the early hours of 1 October 1965, the 30 September Movement attempted to kidnap seven members of the Army general staff. A squad of about 200 soldiers surrounded Yani's home at Latuhahary Street No. 6 in the Jakarta suburb of Menteng. Usually Yani had eleven troops guarding his home. His wife later reported that a week before, additional six men were assigned to him. These men were from the command of Colonel Latief, who, unbeknownst to Yani, was one of the main plotters in 30 September Movement. According to Yani's wife, the additional men did not appear for duty on that night. Yani and his children were asleep in his house while his wife was out celebrating her birthday by staying out with a group of friends and relatives. She later recounted that as she drove away from the home at about 11 pm, she noticed someone sitting in the shadows across the street as if keeping the house under observation. She thought nothing of it at the time, but following the events later that morning she wondered differently. Also, from about 9 pm on the evening of 30 September a number of phone calls were made to the house at intervals, which when answered would be met with silence or a voice would ask what time it was. The calls continued until about 1 am and Mrs Yani said she had a premonition something was wrong that night.

Yani spent the evening with official callers; at 7 pm he received a colonel from the Supreme Operations Command. General Basuki Rahmat, divisional commander in East Java, then arrived from his headquarters in Surabaya. Basuki had come to Jakarta to report to Yani on his concerns about increasing communist activity in East Java. Complimenting his report, Yani asked him to accompany him to his meeting the following morning with the President to relay his account.

When the kidnappers came to Yani's home and told him that he was to be brought before the president, he asked for time to bathe and change his clothes. When this was refused he became angry, slapped one of the kidnapper soldiers, and tried to shut the front door of his house. One of the kidnappers then opened fire, killing him. His body was taken to Lubang Buaya on the outskirts of Jakarta and, together with those of the other murdered generals, was hidden in a disused well.

Yani's body, and those of the other victims, was disinterred on 4 October, and all were given a state funeral the next day, before being buried at the Hero's Cemetery at Kalibata. On the same day, Yani and his colleagues were officially declared Heroes of the Revolution by Presidential Decision No. 111/KOTI/1965 and his rank was raised posthumously from lieutenant general to a 4-star general.

Mrs Yani and her children moved out of the home after Yani's death. Mrs Yani helped make their former home into a public museum which is preserved largely as it was in October 1965, including bullet holes in the door and walls. Today, many Indonesian cities have roads named after Yani, and Semarang's Ahmad Yani International Airport is named after him.

Honours

National honours
  Star of the Republic of Indonesia, 2nd Class (posthumous) (10 November 1965) 
  Star of the Republic of Indonesia, 3rd Class (10 January 1963)
  Sacred Star
  Guerrilla Star
  Indonesian Armed Forces "8 Years" Service Star
  Military Long Service Medal, 16 Years Service
  1st Independence War Medal
  2nd Independence War Medal
  Military Operational Service Medal for Madiun 1947
  Military Operational Service Medal for Central Java 1960
  "Sapta Marga" Medal
  Military Service Medal for Irian Jaya 1962

Foreign honours
:
 Second Rank of the Order of the People's Army with Golden Star (1958)

References

Further reading

Further reading
 Bachtiar, Harsja W. (1988), Siapa Dia?: Perwira Tinggi Tentara Nasional Indonesia Angkatan Darat (Who is S/He?: Senior Officers of the Indonesian Army), Penerbit Djambatan, Jakarta, 
 Mutiara Sumber Widya (publisher) (1999) Album Pahlawan Bangsa (Albam of National Heroes), Jakarta
 Riklefs (1982), A History of Modern Indonesia, Macmillan Southeast Asian reprint, 
 Sekretariat Negara Republik Indonesia (1975) 30 Tahun Indonesia Merdeka: Jilid 3 (1965–1973) (30 Years of Indonesian Independence: Volume 3 (1965–1973)
 Secretariat Negara Republik Indonesia (1994) Gerakan 30 September Pemberontakan Partai Komunis Indonesia: Latar Belakang, Aksi dan Penumpasannya (30 September Movement/Communist Party of Indonesia: Backgrounds, Actions and its Annihilation)
 Simanjuntak, P.H.H (2003) Kabinet-Kabinet Republik Indonesia: Dari Awal Kemerdekaan Sampai Reformasi (Cabinets of the Republic of Indonesia: From the Start of Independence to the Reform Era, Penerbit Djambatan, Jakarta, 
 Sudarmanto, Y.B. (1996) Jejak-Jejak Pahlawan dari Sultan Agung hingga Syekh Yusuf (The Footsteps of Heroes from Sultan Agung to Syekh Yusuf), Penerbit Grasindo, Jakarta 

1922 births
Javanese people
1965 deaths
Chiefs of Staff of the Indonesian Army
Indonesian anti-communists
Indonesian collaborators with Imperial Japan
Indonesian generals
Indonesian military personnel
Indonesian Muslims
Members of Pembela Tanah Air
National Heroes of Indonesia
People from Purworejo Regency